is a 1996 Japanese original video horror film directed by Katsuya Matsumura, released on August 9, 1996.

Cast
Tomorowo Taguchi
 Yuji Kitagawa as Kikuo Sawada
Ryôka Yuzuki as Hitomi Nomura
 Tomorô Taguchi as Kawasaki

Reception
Of Midnight Eye, Tom Mes said the film is "the best realised [of the trilogy] and the most relentless".

See also
All Night Long (1992 film)
All Night Long 2 (1995)

References

External links

1996 direct-to-video films
1996 horror films
Direct-to-video horror films
Films directed by Katsuya Matsumura
Japanese direct-to-video films
Japanese horror films
1996 films
1990s Japanese films